Human cloning is the creation of a genetically identical copy (or clone) of a human. The term is generally used to refer to artificial human cloning, which is the reproduction of human cells and tissue. It does not refer to the natural conception and delivery of identical twins. The possibilities of human cloning have raised controversies. These ethical concerns have prompted several nations to pass laws regarding human cloning.

Two commonly discussed types of human cloning are therapeutic cloning and reproductive cloning.

Therapeutic cloning would involve cloning cells from a human for use in medicine and transplants. Two common methods of therapeutic cloning that are being researched are somatic-cell nuclear transfer and (more recently) pluripotent stem cell induction.

Reproductive cloning would involve making an entire cloned human, instead of just specific cells or tissues.

History
Although the possibility of cloning humans had been the subject of speculation for much of the 20th century, scientists and policymakers began to take the prospect seriously in 1969. J. B. S. Haldane was the first to introduce the idea of human cloning, for which he used the terms "clone" and "cloning", which had been used in agriculture since the early 20th century. In his speech on "Biological Possibilities for the Human Species of the Next Ten Thousand Years" at the Ciba Foundation Symposium on Man and his Future in 1963, he said:

Nobel Prize-winning geneticist Joshua Lederberg advocated cloning and genetic engineering in an article in The American Naturalist in 1966 and again, the following year, in The Washington Post. He sparked a debate with conservative bioethicist Leon Kass, who wrote at the time that "the programmed reproduction of man will, in fact, dehumanize him." Another Nobel Laureate, James D. Watson, publicized the potential and the perils of cloning in his Atlantic Monthly essay, "Moving Toward the Clonal Man", in 1971.

With the cloning of a sheep known as Dolly in 1996 by somatic cell nuclear transfer (SCNT), the idea of human cloning became a hot debate topic. Many nations outlawed it, while a few scientists promised to make a clone within the next few years. The first hybrid human clone was created in November 1998, by Advanced Cell Technology. It was created using SCNT; a nucleus was taken from a man's leg cell and inserted into a cow's egg from which the nucleus had been removed, and the hybrid cell was cultured and developed into an embryo. The embryo was destroyed after 12 days.

In 2004 and 2005, Hwang Woo-suk, a professor at Seoul National University, published two separate articles in the journal  Science claiming to have successfully harvested pluripotent, embryonic stem cells from a cloned human blastocyst using SCNT techniques. Hwang claimed to have created eleven different patient-specific stem cell lines. This would have been the first major breakthrough in human cloning. However, in 2006 Science retracted both of his articles on clear evidence that much of his data from the experiments was fabricated.

In January 2008, Dr. Andrew French and Samuel Wood of the biotechnology company Stemagen announced that they successfully created the first five mature human embryos using SCNT. In this case, each embryo was created by taking a nucleus from a skin cell (donated by Wood and a colleague) and inserting it into a human egg from which the nucleus had been removed. The embryos were developed only to the blastocyst stage, at which point they were studied in processes that destroyed them.  Members of the lab said that their next set of experiments would aim to generate embryonic stem cell lines; these are the "holy grail" that would be useful for therapeutic or reproductive cloning.

In 2011, scientists at the New York Stem Cell Foundation announced that they had succeeded in generating embryonic stem cell lines, but their process involved leaving the oocyte's nucleus in place, resulting in triploid cells, which would not be useful for cloning.

In 2013, a group of scientists led by Shoukhrat Mitalipov published the first report of embryonic stem cells created using SCNT. In this experiment, the researchers developed a protocol for using SCNT in human cells, which differs slightly from the one used in other organisms.  Four embryonic stem cell lines from human fetal somatic cells were derived from those blastocysts. All four lines were derived using oocytes from the same donor, ensuring that all mitochondrial DNA inherited was identical. A year later, a team led by Robert Lanza at Advanced Cell Technology reported that they had replicated Mitalipov's results and further demonstrated the effectiveness by cloning adult cells using SCNT.

In 2018, the first successful cloning of primates using SCNT was reported with the birth of two live female clones, crab-eating macaques named Zhong Zhong and Hua Hua.

Methods

Somatic cell nuclear transfer (SCNT)

In somatic cell nuclear transfer ("SCNT"), the nucleus of a somatic cell is taken from a donor and transplanted into a host egg cell, which had its own genetic material removed previously, making it an enucleated egg. After the donor somatic cell genetic material is transferred into the host oocyte with a micropipette, the somatic cell genetic material is fused with the egg using an electric current. Once the two cells have fused, the new cell can be permitted to grow in a surrogate or artificially. This is the process that was used to successfully clone Dolly the sheep (see ). The technique, now refined, has indicated that it was possible to replicate cells and reestablish pluripotency, or "the potential of an embryonic cell to grow into any one of the numerous different types of mature body cells that make up a complete organism".

Induced pluripotent stem cells (iPSCs)

Creating induced pluripotent stem cells ("iPSCs") is a long and inefficient process. Pluripotency refers to a stem cell that has the potential to differentiate into any of the three germ layers: endoderm (interior stomach lining, gastrointestinal tract, the lungs), mesoderm (muscle, bone, blood, urogenital), or ectoderm (epidermal tissues and nervous tissue). A specific set of genes, often called "reprogramming factors", are introduced into a specific adult cell type. These factors send signals in the mature cell that cause the cell to become a pluripotent stem cell. This process is highly studied and new techniques are being discovered frequently on how to improve this induction process.

Depending on the method used, reprogramming of adult cells into iPSCs for implantation could have severe limitations in humans. If a virus is used as a reprogramming factor for the cell, cancer-causing genes called oncogenes may be activated. These cells would appear as rapidly dividing cancer cells that do not respond to the body's natural cell signaling process. However, in 2008 scientists discovered a technique that could remove the presence of these oncogenes after pluripotency induction, thereby increasing the potential use of iPSC in humans.

Comparing SCNT to reprogramming
Both the processes of SCNT and iPSCs have benefits and deficiencies. Historically, reprogramming methods were better studied than SCNT derived embryonic stem cells (ESCs). However, more recent studies have put more emphasis on developing new procedures for SCNT-ESCs. The major advantage of SCNT over iPSCs at this time is the speed with which cells can be produced. iPSCs derivation takes several months while SCNT would take a much shorter time, which could be important for medical applications. New studies are working to improve the process of iPSC in terms of both speed and efficiency with the discovery of new reprogramming factors in oocytes. Another advantage SCNT could have over iPSCs is its potential to treat mitochondrial disease, as it utilizes a donor oocyte. No other advantages are known at this time in using stem cells derived from one method over stem cells derived from the other.

Uses and actual potential

Work on cloning techniques has advanced our understanding of developmental biology in humans. Observing human pluripotent stem cells grown in culture provides great insight into human embryo development, which otherwise cannot be seen. Scientists are now able to better define steps of early human development. Studying signal transduction along with genetic manipulation within the early human embryo has the potential to provide answers to many developmental diseases and defects. Many human-specific signaling pathways have been discovered by studying human embryonic stem cells. Studying developmental pathways in humans has given developmental biologists more evidence toward the hypothesis that developmental pathways are conserved throughout species.

iPSCs and cells created by SCNT are useful for research into the causes of disease, and as model systems used in drug discovery.

Cells produced with SCNT, or iPSCs could eventually be used in stem cell therapy, or to create organs to be used in transplantation, known as regenerative medicine. Stem cell therapy is the use of stem cells to treat or prevent a disease or condition. Bone marrow transplantation is a widely used form of stem cell therapy. No other forms of stem cell therapy are in clinical use at this time. Research is underway to potentially use stem cell therapy to treat heart disease, diabetes, and spinal cord injuries. Regenerative medicine is not in clinical practice, but is heavily researched for its potential uses. This type of medicine would allow for autologous transplantation, thus removing the risk of organ transplant rejection by the recipient. For instance, a person with liver disease could potentially have a new liver grown using their same genetic material and transplanted to remove the damaged liver. In current research, human pluripotent stem cells have been promised as a reliable source for generating human neurons, showing the potential for regenerative medicine in brain and neural injuries.

Ethical implications

In bioethics, the ethics of cloning refers to a variety of ethical positions regarding the practice and possibilities of cloning, especially human cloning. While many of these views are religious in origin,  for instance relating to Christian views of procreation and personhood, the questions raised by cloning engage secular perspectives as well, particularly the concept of identity.

Advocates support development of therapeutic cloning in order to generate tissues and whole organs to treat patients who otherwise cannot obtain transplants, to avoid the need for immunosuppressive drugs, and to stave off the effects of aging.  Advocates for reproductive cloning believe that parents who cannot otherwise procreate should have access to the technology.

Opposition to therapeutic cloning mainly centers around the status of embryonic stem cells, which has connections with the abortion debate.

Some opponents of reproductive cloning have concerns that technology is not yet developed enough to be safe – for example, the position of the American Association for the Advancement of Science , while others emphasize that reproductive cloning could be prone to abuse (leading to the generation of humans whose organs and tissues would be harvested), and have concerns about how cloned individuals could integrate with families and with society at large.

Members of religious groups are divided. Some Christian theologians perceive the technology as usurping God's role in creation and, to the extent embryos are used, destroying a human life; others see no inconsistency between Christian tenets and cloning's positive and potentially life-saving benefits.

Current law

In 2018 it was reported that about 70 countries had banned human cloning.

In popular culture

Science fiction has used cloning, most commonly and specifically human cloning, due to the fact that it brings up controversial questions of identity. Humorous fiction, such as Multiplicity (1996) and the Maxwell Smart feature The Nude Bomb (1980), have featured human cloning. A recurring sub-theme of cloning fiction is the use of clones as a supply of organs for transplantation. Robin Cook's 1997 novel Chromosome 6, Michael Bay's The Island, and Nancy Farmer's 2002 novel House of the Scorpion are examples of this; Chromosome 6 also features genetic manipulation and xenotransplantation. The Star Wars saga makes use of millions of human clones to form the Grand Army of the Republic that participated in the Clone Wars. The series Orphan Black follows human clones' stories and experiences as they deal with issues and react to being the property of a chain of scientific institutions. In the 2019 horror film Us, the entirety of the United States' population is secretly cloned. Years later, these clones (known as The Tethered) reveal themselves to the world by successfully pulling off a mass genocide of their counterparts.

See also
 Homunculus
 CRISPR gene editing

Notes

References

Further reading
 Araujo, Robert John, "The UN Declaration on Human Cloning: a survey and assessment of the debate," 7 The National Catholic Bioethics Quarterly 129 – 149 (2007).
 Seyyed Hassan Eslami Ardakani, Human Cloning in Catholic and Islamic Perspectives, University of Religions and Denominations, 2007
 Oregon Health & Science University. "Human skin cells converted into embryonic stem cells: First time human stem cells have been produced via nuclear transfer." ScienceDaily. ScienceDaily, 15 May 2013. .

External links

 "Variations and voids: the regulation of human cloning around the world" academic article by S. Pattinson & T. Caulfield
 Moving Toward the Clonal Man
 Should We Really Fear Reproductive Human Cloning
 United Nation declares law against cloning.
 General Assembly Adopts United Nations Declaration on Human Cloning By Vote of 84-34-37
 Cloning Fact Sheet
 How Human Cloning Will Work

Biotechnology